Yoram Dori (born 1950) is a strategic advisor. He served for years as a close advisor for Israel's President Shimon Peres. Dori is the director general of Dori ltd.

Biography

Early Years
Dori was born in Tel Aviv. He served in the Israeli Army as an instructor for tank gunnery. In the Yom Kippur War, he fought in Sinai as a gunner in the 600th Tank Regiment. The tank was hit and the tank commander Mordechai Ilan Kitai was killed.

After his military service completed a B.A degree at Tel Aviv University Department of Political Science and Philosophy division. He earned a master's degree in the Department of Work Studies at Tel Aviv University.

Career
Dori served as acting secretary of the National organization of student members of the Israeli Labor Party. He worked as the manager of the youth department of the workers organization in Tel Aviv and took charge of the press and public relations division at the Jewish Agency and the World Zionist Organization in Tel Aviv. He served as spokesman for Agency Chairman Simcha Dinitz, The Moshavim movement, the 11th Maccabiah Games and 12th and as an executive and spokesman of Hapoel T.A.

He served as the spokesman and media advisor for the Labor Party under the chairmanship of Yitzhak Rabin, Shimon Peres and Ehud Barak. In the early millennium served as special advisor to the Peres Center for Peace.

After Peres was elected President of Israel, he was appointed as strategic advisor to the President. For many years he was the spokesman of the World Restitution Organization (WJRO). He led the media campaign against Swiss banks on dormant accounts from the Holocaust.Yoram Dori is the spokesperson of "CIMI" and "the society of preservation of heritage sites in Israel". Dori was the chairman of the board of Asia Pituach ltd and now he is a member of the board of Limmud fsu

Personal
Dori is married to Batia, has four children and 5 grandchildren and lives in Givat Shmuel near Tel Aviv.

References

External links
The Jerusalem Post - Similar but different 

Israeli Jews
Israeli political consultants
Living people
1950 births